Ola Kvernberg (born 16 June 1981) is a Norwegian jazz musician known for his virtuosic string swing violin playing and his international performances. He is the son of traditional musicians Liv Rypdal Kvernberg and Torbjørn Kvernberg, and the brother of traditional musicians Kari Kvernberg Dajani and fiddler Jorun Marie Kvernberg, and grandson of the fiddler and traditional music composer Peter L. Rypdal. Kvernberg studied classical violin from the age of nine, and won 3rd prize in a great classical violin competition in Italy when he was fourteen.

String swing with Hot Club de Norvège

Kvernberg was born in Fræna.  He began to play folk music at an early age and was classically trained through the municipal music school. His first record release was with the band Fear of flying in 1995. Two years later, when he was 16, he began playing jazz, and was educated on the Jazz program at Trondheim musikkonservatorium (2001–03).

Kvernberg spontaneously became known after a meeting with Hot Club de Norvège in 2000 during the annual Django Festival in Oslo, where he actually jammed with Toots Thielemans. This gave rise to release album Hot Club de Norvege presenting Ola Kvernberg and Jimmy Rosenberg (2000), the solo release Ola Kvernberg (2001), as well as participation on the record Angelo is back in town with Angelo Debarre (2001), which he also played with at the Django Festival in January 2002. In April 2002, Ola was soloist on Jon Larsen's jazz symphony White Night Stories, together with Hot Club de Norvège and Tromsø Symphony Orchestra, and on two recordings with this project.

His own trio
Ola Kvernberg Trio with Steinar Raknes (bass) and Doug Raney (guitar) released the album Cats and Doug (Hot Club Records, 2002).
Erik Nylander (drums) replaced Raney on the production of Eboue Seck's Wolof Experience at
(Moldejazz 2005). On Vossajazz 2006, they play with Vidar Busk, accompanied by Håkon Mjåset Johansen (drums). The trio (with Nylander/Raknes) released the album Night (Jazzland, 2006) with the Kvernberg's own compositions.  People was published in 2009. The commissioned work Liarbird to the Jazz 2010 was released. For the record Liarbird he won the Spellemannprisen 2011 in the class jazz.

Other collaborations
He played with Niels-Henning Ørsted Pedersen and Philip Catherine at Moldejazz 2004, and was involved in the Ingebrigt Håker Flaten Quintet, the trio Gammalgrass with Stian Carstensen and Ole Morten Vågan, in The Scarlatti Ensemble with Kim Myhr, Eirik Hegdal and Marianne Baudouin Lie, with Siri Gjære's Trønderhøns and as a guest in Banjovi with Finn Guttormsen, Stian Carstensen, Haakon Askeland, Kjartan Iversen and Knut Hem. In 2007 he was with Thomas Dybdahl on tour. In 2008 Kvernberg contributed on the Jon Larsen's The Jimmy Carl Black Story.

He is portrayed in the Stein Kagge's book Fra Satchmo til Ola Kvernberg (2001), and he is the brother of traditional musician Jorun Marie Kvernberg (1979).

Honors
2010: Amanda Award, nominated, in the category best soundtrack for the movie Nord.
2011: Spellemannprisen (Norwegian Grammys) winner, Jazz album of the year, for Liarbird
2012: Kongsberg Jazz Award - winner
2013: Kanon Award winner, in the category best soundtrack for the movie Jag etter vind
2013: Amanda Award winner, in the category best soundtrack for the movie Jag etter vind
2015: Grand Scores nominated, in the category "Best Electro-Acoustic Score" for the movie Two Raging Grannies
2015: Kanon Award nominated, in the category best soundtrack for the movie Two Raging Grannies
2015: Spellemannprisen (Norwegian Grammys) nominated, Jazz album of the year, for The Mechanical Fair
2015: Spellemannprisen (Norwegian Grammys) nominated, mixed genres album of the year, for Obsolete Music 1
2016: Kanon Award nominated, in the category best soundtrack for the movie Staying Alive

Discography

Solo albums
2001: Violin (Hot Club Records)
2014: Mechanical Fair (Jazzland Recordings), commission for Kongsberg Jazz Festival 2013, including with the Trondheim Soloists
2017: Steamdome (Grappa Music)
2021: Steamdome II: The Hypogean

Within Ola Kvernberg Trio
2002: Cats and Doug (Hot Club Records), feat. the guitarist Doug Raney
2006: Night Driver (Jazzland Recordings), performing Kvernberg's compositions
2009: Folk (Jazzland Recordings)
2013: Northern Tapes (Jazzland Recordings)

Within Liarbird
2011: Liarbird (Jazzland Recordings), the commissioned work, live from Moldejazz 2010 including Bergmund Waal Skaslien (viola), Eirik Hegdal (saxophone), Mathias Eick (trumpet), Håkon Kornstad (saxophone), Ingebrigt Håker Flaten and Ole Morten Vågan (bass), as well as Erik Nylander and Torstein Lofthus (drums)

Within Grand General, quintet including Erlend Slettevoll, Even Helte Hermansen, Kenneth Kapstad and Trond Frønes
2013: Grand General (Rune Grammofon)

Collaborations
With Hot Club de Norvege
2000: Hot Club De Norvege Featuring Ola Kvernberg and Jimmy Rosenberg (Hot Club Records)
2005: White Night Live (Hot Club Records), feat. Ola Kvernberg and Tromsø Symphony Orchestra

Within Ingebrigt Håker Flaten Quintet
2006: Quintet (Jazzland Recordings)
2008: The Year Of The Boar (Jazzland Recordings)

Within Trondheim Jazz Orchestra
2006: Tribute (MNJ Records), feat. Vigleik Storaas
2007: Live In Oslo (MNJ Records), feat. Maria Kannegaard Trio

Within Team Hegdal sextet including Eirik Hegdal, André Roligheten, Rune Nergaard, Mattias Ståhl and Gard Nilssen
2011: Vol 2 (Øra Fonogram), including additional

Within Ingebrigt Håker Flaten Chicago Sextet, including Dave Rempis, Frank Rosaly, Jason Adasiewicz and Jeff Parker
2012: Ingebrigt Håker Flaten Chicago Sextet Live At Jazzfest Saalfelden (Tektite Records Co.Operative)

Within Gammalgrass
2013: Obsolete Music 1 (Division Records)

Within the trio Kirsti, Ola & Erik
2015: Rags & Silk (Name Music & Publishing)

Film music
2010: Nord Film Music (Jazzland Recordings), trio including Andreas Aase (guitars, mandolin, dobro) and Stian Carstensen (banjo), Ola Kvernbergs Filmmscore for the critically acclaimed Erlend Loe movie Nord
2010: Eksperimentet, a Danish drama film written and directed by Louise Friedberg, starring Ellen Hillingsø.
2013: Soundtrack for the movie Jag etter vind.

References

External links

Ola Kvernberg Myspace.com
Thomas Dybdahl Official Website
Ola Kvernberg Trio at Sardinen USF November 16, 2012, Bergen Jazzforum on YouTube
Liarbird at Kolben Concert Hall September 17, 2011, Rikskonsertene on YouTube

20th-century Norwegian violinists
21st-century Norwegian violinists
Norwegian jazz violinists
Male violinists
Norwegian jazz composers
Male jazz composers
Jazzland Recordings (1997) artists
Rune Grammofon artists
Hot Club Records artists
Norwegian University of Science and Technology alumni
Spellemannprisen winners
Best Original Score Guldbagge Award winners
People from Fræna
1981 births
Living people
Musicians from Møre og Romsdal
20th-century guitarists
21st-century guitarists
21st-century violinists
20th-century Norwegian male musicians
21st-century Norwegian male musicians
Trondheim Jazz Orchestra members
Ola Kvernberg Trio members
Grand General (band) members